The Osbourne Family Album was a various artists compilation album based on the television series The Osbournes with the songs selected by the family.  It included the theme song "Crazy Train" (Pat Boone's version) as well as contributions by Ozzy and Kelly. The songs were interspersed with dialogue from the show. The odd number tracks are dialogue from the show while the even number tracks are songs. Released on June 12, 2002, it was dedicated to family member Aimee who chose not to participate in the television show.  The album was released during the second season of the series. The album received a parental advisory sticker for the dialogue tracks, which contain profanity (a censored version "bleeps" the profanity).

Track listing
  Dialogue
  "Crazy Train" - Pat Boone
  Dialogue
  "Dreamer" - Ozzy Osbourne
  Dialogue
  "Papa Don't Preach" - Kelly Osbourne
  Dialogue
  "You Really Got Me" - The Kinks
  Dialogue
  "Snowblind" - System of a Down
  Dialogue
  "Imagine" - John Lennon
  Dialogue
  "Drive" - The Cars
  Dialogue
  "Good Souls" - Starsailor
  Dialogue
  "Mirror Image" - Dillusion
  Dialogue
  "Wonderful Tonight" - Eric Clapton
  Dialogue
  "Mama, I'm Coming Home" - Ozzy Osbourne
  Dialogue
  "Crazy Train" - Ozzy Osbourne
  Dialogue
  "Family System" - Chevelle
  Dialogue

NOTE: The album's packaging does not list the dialogue tracks.

References

Television soundtracks 
2002 compilation albums
2002 soundtrack albums
Ozzy Osbourne
Kelly Osbourne
Osbourne family